Maria Bethânia is the self-titled debut studio album by Brazilian singer Maria Bethânia. It was first released in June, 1965, under RCA Victor label, as an LP in mono version. In 1971, the album was re-released in stereo mode under RCA Camden. In 1996, a remastered CD version was released by Sony BMG.

Track listing

Personnel
Maria Bethânia – vocals
Roberto Jorge – producer
Alberto Soluri  – sound engineer
Gauss – sound engineer
Fernando Goldgaber – photography

Formats
Vinyl  – includes the 12-track album in mono version.
Vinyl  (1971) – includes the 12-track album in stereo version.
CD  – Remastered 12-track edition includes all tracks from the original album.

References

1965 albums
Maria Bethânia albums
Portuguese-language albums